Theo Diegelmann (born 23 November 1939) is a retired German football goalkeeper. Altogether he had from 1963 to 1972 266 appearances in the Regionalliga, in this time the second tier of the league system in Germany.

Career 
Diegelmann could three times qualify for the promotion round to the Bundesliga. The third time he reached the promotion, but he came to no insert in the Bundesliga. The greatest surprise however was the second place with the SSV Reutlingen behind Bayern Munich in the 1964–65 Regionalliga and the second place too in the following promotion round behind Borussia Mönchengladbach – so they were defeated in turn only by the both most famous and successful German clubs of the 1970s.

From 1963 until 1970 Diegelmann was ever first-choice goalkeeper of his clubs.

References

External links
 
 

1939 births
Living people
German footballers
Borussia Fulda players
SSV Reutlingen 05 players
VfL Bochum players
1. FC Nürnberg players
Association football goalkeepers